Michael Hugh Waitt (born 25 June 1960) is an English association football player and coach, who managed the New Zealand national football team. Waitt played in the Football League for Notts County and Lincoln City FC. He took charge of the New Zealand national side June 2002. New Zealand won eleven, drew two and lost ten of his 23 games in charge. He now works for Quokkas.

Playing career

New Zealand
In 1990, while playing in Hong Kong for Lai Sun, Waitt visited his sister in Wellington. Whilst in New Zealand he was contacted by his erstwhile manager Keith Buckley who was coaching Napier City Rovers. Buckley invited Waitt to play for the club and he did so, spending the 1990 season with the club, scoring 8 goals in 14 National Soccer League appearances. He returned to the UK, joining Spalding United in December 1990, Nuneaton Borough in January 1991 and Grantham two months later. He moved on to join Gedling Town and then Ilkeston Town before emigrating permanently to New Zealand in January 1992.

He departed the New Zealand post following the expiry of his contract.

References

External links
Lincoln City F.C. Official Archive Profile

Living people
New Zealand association football coaches
Lincoln City F.C. players
Notts County F.C. players
New Zealand national football team managers
1960 births
Association football forwards
English footballers
English Football League players
Ilkeston Town F.C. (1945) players
English expatriate football managers
English expatriate sportspeople in New Zealand
Expatriate association football managers in New Zealand